Carolyn Arends is a Canadian contemporary Christian musician, songwriter, and author. She is based in Surrey, British Columbia, Canada.

Musical career
Arends began her career as a songwriter at Benson Music Publishing. In 1995, Carolyn began touring and releasing albums as a singer and guitarist. Her debut release that year (I Can Hear You) was released through Reunion Records. I Can Hear You reached No. 37 on Billboard Magazine's Contemporary Christian Chart in 1996. Feel Free peaked at No. 10 on the chart in 1997. More recently her albums have been distributed by Signpost Music (Steve Bell's label). She is the winner of two Gospel Music Association Dove Awards and six GMA Canada Covenant Awards. Carolyn co-hosted the 29th Annual Covenant Awards in 2007 (with Leland Klassen) and the 31st Annual Covenant Awards in 2009 (with Arlen Salte).

Discography

Albums

Singles

Books 
 Feel Free (1997)
 Living the Questions: Making Sense of the Mess and Mystery of Life (Harvest House, 2000)
 Ragamuffin Prayers (2000, by Jimmy Abegg, contributions by Carolyn Arends and others)
 We've Been Waiting for You (2002)
 Wrestling With Angels: Adventures in Faith and Doubt (Harvest House, 2008)

Collaborations 
 co-wrote lyrics for "Diamonds from the Other Side" with Steve Bell on his album: Waiting for Aidan (Signpost, 2001)
 co-wrote lyrics for "Not So Hip" with Bec Abbot on her album: Not So Hip (Signpost, 2005)

Notable appearances 
 Parachute Music Festival (January 1997)
 Cornerstone Festival (July 1997)
 Kingdom Bound (August 1997)
 Cornerstone Festival (July 2002)
 harmony vocals on "He Will Listen To You", "Rest", and "The Peace of Christ" on Glen Soderholm's album Rest (Signpost, 2003)
 duet on "One Heart" on Greg Magirescu's album Sweet Surrender (Angel Cake Café, 2003)
 harmony vocals on "Approach My Soul The Mercy Seat" and "Come Ye Disconsolate" on Glen Soderholm's World Without End (Signpost, 2006)
 vocals on Jacob Moon's "Winter Song", "It Came Upon The Midnight Clear" and "O Come, O Come, Emmanuel", This Christmas (Signpost, 2007)

Songs in other projects 
 Vancouver Seeds VI, "No Trespassing" (1991)
 Music You Can Believe In, "Seize the Day" (Reunion, 1995)
 Noel, "What Child Is This", with Brent Bourgeois and Derri Daugherty (Via, 1995)
 Noel, "Angels We Have Heard on High", with Jenny Gullen and Stephen Murray (Via, 1995)
 Orphans of God: A Tribute to Mark Heard, "Love Is So Blind" (Fingerprint, 1996)
 Within the Sound of Your Voice by Amy Morriss, "Has to Be You" (Myrrh, 1997)
 Songs 4 Life: Renew Your Heart, "Seize the Day" (Madacy, 1998)
 Keep the Faith 2000, "Love Is Always There" (Chordant, 1998)
 Awesome God: A Tribute to Rich Mullins, "Jacob and Two Women" (Reunion, November 10, 1998)
 Prince of Peace, "Seize the Day" (Brentwood, 1999)
 Sing Me to Sleep, Mommy, "You Bring Me Joy" (Brentwood, April 27, 1999)
 Yes I Believe in God, "Happy" (Reunion, 1999)
 Songs for the Soul: Grace, "Seize the Day" (Madacy, 2000)
 Songs for the Soul: Joy, "Happy" (Madacy, 2000)
 Rock on Christian, "This I Know" (Madacy, 2001)
 Rock on Worship, "Father Thy Will Be Done" (Madacy, 2002)
 Signpost Collections, Vol. 1, "Dance Like No One's Watching" and "We've Been Waiting For You" (Signpost, 2003)
 Sons & Daughters by Steve Bell and Sarah Bell, "Getting Ready For Glory" (Signpost, 2004)
 28th Annual Covenant Hits, "Something To Give" (CMC, 2007)
 Sea to Sea: The Voice of Creation, "Land of the Living" (CMC, 2007)
 GMA Canada presents 30th Anniversary Collection, "Seize the Day" (CMC, 2008)
 Sea to Sea: Christmas, "Angels We Have Heard on High" (Lakeside, 2009)

Awards and recognition 
GMA Canada Covenant Awards
 2002 Pop/Contemporary Song of the Year, "Dance Like No One's Watching"
 2003 Inspirational Album of the Year, We've Been Waiting for You
 2005 Inspirational Song of the Year, "Getting Ready For Glory, from Under the Gaze 2005 Seasonal Album of the Year, Christmas: An Irrational Season 2006 Pop/Contemporary Song of the Year, "Not So Hip" (co-written with Bec Abbot)
 2007 Folk/Roots Song of the Year, "Everybody Wants Everything" (co-written with her brother Chris Jonat)
 2009 nominee, Female Vocalist of the Year
 2010 Folk-Roots Song of the Year: "Be Still"
 2010 CD/DVD Artwork Design of the Year: Love Was Here FirstGMA Dove Awards
 1995 Country Recorded Song of the Year: "Love Will" (co-written with Connie Harrington and Michael James)
 1996 nominee, New Artist of the Year
 1997 International Artist of the Year

Juno Awards
 1998 nominee, Best Gospel Album, Feel Free 2002 nominee, Best Gospel Album, Travelers 2007 nominee, Contemporary Christian/Gospel Album of the Year, Pollyanna's AtticShai Awards (formerly The Vibe Awards)
 2003 Female Vocalist of the Year
 2003 Inspirational Album of the Year: We've Been Waiting For You 2005 Female Soloist Artist of the Year
 2005 Folk Album of the Year, Under the Gaze 2005 Inspirational Album of the Year, Under the Gaze 2005 Seasonal Album of the Year, Christmas: An Irrational Season 2007 Folk Album of the Year, Pollyanna's AtticWestern Canadian Music Awards
 2010 nominee, Contemporary Christian/Gospel Recording of the Year: Love Was Here First''

See also 

Music of Canada
List of Canadian musicians

References 
Notes

Citations

External links 
 

1968 births
20th-century Canadian women writers
21st-century Canadian women writers
Canadian women pop singers
Canadian performers of Christian music
Canadian women singer-songwriters
Canadian singer-songwriters
Christian music songwriters
Christian writers
Living people
Musicians from Vancouver
People from Surrey, British Columbia
Women religious writers
Writers from Vancouver